Amance is a commune in the Aube department in the Grand Est region of north-central France.

The inhabitants of the commune are known as Amançois or Amançoises.

Geography
Amance is located some 30 km east of Troyes and 10 km south of Brienne-le-Chateau.  It can be accessed from Brienne-le-Chateau and Dienville in the north by road D443 which runs south to the village then through the heart of the commune south to Vendeuvre-sur-Barse. The road D112 also goes south-east to Vauchonvilliers and the D18 road goes east to Jessains.

The commune consists of farmland in the east but is heavily forested in the west to about 50% of its area. Apart from the village there is also the hamlet of La Ville aux Bois south-west of the village.

The Amance River runs through the village to the north into the Canal d'Amenee and forms part of the western boundary of the commune. A few small streams flow into it.

Neighbouring communes and villages

History
In 1825 Amance absorbed La Ville-aux-Bois-lès-Vendeuvre which should not be confused with La Ville-aux-Bois commune also in the Aube.

Administration

List of Successive Mayors of Amance

Population

Culture and heritage

Civil heritage
The Town Hall contains three items that are registered as historical objects:
A Wardrobe (18th century)
A Louis XVI Chair (18th century)
The Furniture in the Town Hall

Religious heritage
The Church of Saint Martin is a unique Romanesque building, rebuilt in the 16th and 19th centuries.

The Church contains many items that are registered as historical objects:

A Statue: The Virgin (16th century)
Stained glass windows (16th century)
A Baptismal font (16th century)
A Painted Panel: Placing in the Tomb (disappeared) (16th century)
A Bronze Bell (1680)
A Pulpit (18th century)
A Tombstone (17th century)
A Painting: Institution of the Rosary (18th century)
A Painting: Charity of Saint Martin (17th century)
A Sculpture: Christ on the Cross (16th century)
A Group Sculpture: Education of the Virgin (16th century)
The Furniture in the Church of Saint Martin

The Parish Church of the Assumption at La Ville-aux-Bois also contains many items that are registered as historical objects:

A Tombstone of Nicolas de Rochetaillée and his wife (1496)
A Statue: Virgin and child (17th century)
A Statue: Saint Sebastian (17th century)
A Processional Staff: Virgin and child (18th century)
A Statue: Saint Éloi (18th century)
A Painting: Assumption (18th century)
The main Altar, Retable, Tabernacle, and exhibition (18th century)
A Statuette: Saint Nicolas (18th century)
A Statuette: Saint Catherine (18th century)
A Chest (18th century)
A Sculpture: Christ on the Cross (17th century)
A Monstrance (19th century)
The Tombstone of Gaspard de Pons and his wife (1670)
A Painting: Marriage of the Virgin (18th century)
A Painting: Adoration of the Magii (17th century)
A Painting: Flagellation (18th century)
The Tombstone of Antoine de Mertrus (17th century)
The Furniture in the Church of the Assumption

See also 
 Communes of the Aube department
 Orient Forest Regional Natural Park

References

External links
Amance on Géoportail, National Geographic Institute (IGN) website 
Amance on the 1750 Cassini Map

Communes of Aube